The Mystery of Banking is Murray Rothbard's 1983 book explaining the modern fractional-reserve banking system and its origins. In his June 2008 preface to the 298-page second edition, Douglas E. French suggests the work also lays out the “...devastating effects [of fractional-reserve banking] on the lives of every man, woman, and child.”

Rothbard dedicated the book to Thomas Jefferson, Charles Holt Campbell, and Ludwig von Mises, all “Champions of Hard Money.”

See also
 Austrian Business Cycle Theory

External links
 The Mystery of Banking (PDF and ePub), 2nd edition (2008).

1983 non-fiction books
Books by Murray Rothbard